Embarq Corporation or Embarq Holdings Company LLC, a telecommunications company based in Overland Park, Kansas.

Embarq may also refer to:

 Individual operating companies of the aforementioned company:
 Embarq Florida
 Embarq Minnesota
 Embarq Missouri
 The EMBARQ Network, a center within the World Resources Institute, Washington, D.C.

See also
Embarkation (disambiguation)